The 2008 United States Senate election in Texas was held on November 4, 2008. Incumbent Republican John Cornyn defeated Democratic nominee Rick Noriega, a member of the Texas House of Representatives, to win re-election to a second term in office.

Democratic primary

Candidates 
 Gene Kelly, U.S. Air Force veteran and nominee for the U.S. Senate in 2000
 Ray McMurrey, teacher at Mary Carroll High School
 Rick Noriega, State Representative
 Rhett Smith, U.S. Navy veteran and auditor at the Texas Department of Human Services

Results

Republican primary

Candidates 
 John Cornyn, incumbent U.S. Senator
 Larry Kilgore, conservative/Secessionist activist

Results

General election

Candidates 
 John Cornyn (R), incumbent U.S. Senator
 Rick Noriega (D), State Representative
 Yvonne Adams Schick (L), real estate entrepreneur

Campaign 
Cornyn, running as an incumbent, had a 42% approval rating with a 43% disapproval rating in June 2007. Texas is a red state, that Republican presidential nominee John McCain won with over 55% of the vote. Cornyn slightly underperformed McCain. However, Noriega underperformed both 2008 Democratic presidential candidate Barack Obama in Texas and Cornyn's 2002 opponent, Ron Kirk, with Noriega receiving just 42.8% of the vote.

Predictions

Polling

Results

See also 
 2008 United States Senate elections

References

External links 
 Elections Division from the Texas Secretary of State
 U.S. Congress candidates for Texas at Project Vote Smart
 Texas, U.S. Senate from CQ Politics
 Texas U.S. Senate from OurCampaigns.com
 Texas Senate race from 2008 Race Tracker
 Campaign contributions from OpenSecrets
 Cornyn (R-i) vs Noriega (D) graph of multiple polls from Pollster.com
 Official campaign websites (Archived)
 John Cornyn, Republican candidate
 Rick Noriega, Democratic candidate
 Yvonne Schick, Libertarian candidate

2008
Texas
United States Senate